Paarens Beach Provincial Park is a provincial park in central British Columbia, Canada. It is located on the south-west shore of Stuart Lake, to the west of Fort St. James.

History
Paarens Beach Provincial is set in the midst of a historic region. A short walk from the park is the Fort St. James National Historic Site, which is housed in the Fort St. James. It is a restored Hudson’s Bay Company Post. The post commemorates the partnership between the fur traders and First Nations People.

Sights
In the vicinity of the park is another historic building, Our Lady of Good Hope Church. Built in 1873, it is the third oldest church in the province. It closed in 1951, but there is a weekly mass in the summer months, which visitors can attend.

Wildlife
The park's contrasting terrain and the different types of vegetation form rich habitats for species like moose, black bear, mule and white-tail deer, wolf, and grizzly bear. The park also has a healthy population of lynx, beaver, mink, marten, fisher, otter and wolverine.

References

External links

Provincial parks of British Columbia
Regional District of Bulkley-Nechako
1972 establishments in British Columbia
Protected areas established in 1972